Charaxes  musashi, the Sulawesi tawny rajah, is a butterfly in the family Nymphalidae. It was described by Etsuzo Tsukada in 1991. It is endemic to Sulawesi in the  Australasian realm.

References

External links
Charaxes Ochsenheimer, 1816 at Markku Savela's Lepidoptera and Some Other Life Forms

musashi
Butterflies described in 1991